First-seeded Joan Hartigan defeated Coral Buttsworth 6–4, 6–3, in the final to win the women's singles tennis title at the 1933 Australian Championships.

Seeds
The seeded players are listed below. Joan Hartigan is the champion; others show the round in which they were eliminated.

 Joan Hartigan (champion)
 Coral Buttsworth (finalist)
 Emily Hood Westacott (semifinals)
 Marjorie Crawford (second round)
 Frances Hoddle-Wrigley (semifinals)
 Nell Hall (quarterfinals)
 Mall Molesworth (quarterfinals)
 Nancy Lewis (quarterfinals)

Draw

Key
 Q = Qualifier
 WC = Wild card
 LL = Lucky loser
 r = Retired

Finals

Earlier rounds

Section 1

Section 2

External links
 

1933 in women's tennis
1933
1933 in Australian tennis
1933 in Australian women's sport
Women's Singles